Diocesan School for Girls (Dio) is a private girls' school in Epsom, Auckland, New Zealand. It is consistently a top-achieving school nationally. The school is Anglican-based and was established in 1903. It caters to international students and has accommodation for 50 boarders at Innes House. The school elected to offer students the option of International Baccalaureate diplomas, as an alternative to the national NCEA qualification, from 2008.

History
Bishop Moore Richard Neligan first proposed the Diocesan School for Girls in October 1903. A subcommittee of the synod purchased land in November 1903, and the first class began on 27 May 1904 with twenty-five students and Mary Etheldred Pulling as headmistress. Neligan formally dedicated the school on 14 June 1904, and the school celebrates its birthday on this date. The founders were Auckland businessperson Stephen Cochrane, Dr Ernest Roberton, Lord Ranfully, Edwin Mitchelson, Bishop Williams of Waiapu and Bishop Neligan  
The former Goodall Construction company constructed many of the buildings.

Houses 
Diocesan has eight houses, into which the students are grouped. In the senior school (years 7-13), there are “tutor” groups, which consists of one tutor teacher, and the students in a particular house and year. eg. Year 9 Selwyn. Each house is named after someone close to the school.

Enrolment
As a private school, Diocesan School receives little funding from the government and charges parents of students tuition fees to cover costs. As of 2015, the school tuition fees for domestic students (i.e. New Zealand citizens and residents) are approximately $18,000 for day students in Years 1 to 6 and $21,000 for day students in Years 7 to 13. Boarders pay an extra $15,000 per year.

At the school's February 2010 Education Review Office (ERO) review, Diocesan School had 1479 students, including 16 international students. Around 75 percent of students at the school identified as New Zealand European (Pākehā), six percent as another European ethnicity, eight percent as Chinese, three percent as Indian, four percent as another Asian ethnicity, two percent as Māori, one percent as Pacific Islanders, and one percent as another ethnicity.

Technology
The school opened a $4 million science block in 1999. During that year a pilot system to supply all students with notebooks was run with two year-8 classes. By November 1999 the school had three IT staff, supporting 469 PCs (150 of which were notebooks), 110 printers, and 6 file servers. The school introduced electronic whiteboards in 2005 that allow students to download classnotes directly to their notebooks. In 2006, it ranked as the 96th largest IT organisation in New Zealand, with a staff of eight supporting 300 PCs and 1,170 notebooks. in 2012 the school officially opened a new water-based sports turf and underground car park. The sports turf is identical in likeness to the one in London built for the 2012 London olympics.

Headmistresses and principals
Since the school was established, there have been 11 headmistresses or principals.

Notable alumnae

 Stephanie Bond – netball player 
 Margaret Brimble – chemist
Alice Bush – doctor and paediatrician
 Niki Caro – writer and director of Whale Rider and Mulan
 Kimberley Crossman – Shortland Street television actor
 Sian Elias – New Zealand's first female Chief Justice
 Holly Rose Emery – model
 Charlotte Glennie – television journalist 
 Katie Glynn – field hockey player, member of Black Sticks Women (2009–)
 Christobelle Grierson-Ryrie – winner of the first cycle of New Zealand's Next Top Model, attended in 2009 
 Ella Gunson – field hockey player, member of Black Sticks Women (2009–)
 Samantha Harrison – field hockey player, member of Black Sticks Women (2009–) (also attended Whangarei Girls' High School)
 Anna Lawrence – Olympic field hockey midfielder 
 Jamie McDell – New Zealand singer, before moving on to King's College 
 Meredith Orr – Olympic field hockey midfielder 
 Una Platts – art historian
 Allison Roe MBE – winner of the 1981 New York and Boston Marathons 
 Jaime Ridge – Socialite, before moving to King's College for Year 12
 May Smith – painter, engraver, textile designer and textile printer 
 Peggy Spicer – artist
 Sarah Ulmer – first New Zealander to win an Olympic cycling gold medal

References

External links
 School website

Anglican schools in New Zealand
Boarding schools in New Zealand
Girls' schools in New Zealand
Educational institutions established in 1903
International Baccalaureate schools in New Zealand
Primary schools in Auckland
Secondary schools in Auckland
1903 establishments in New Zealand
Alliance of Girls' Schools Australasia